Isaac Ruth Sherwood (August 13, 1835 – October 15, 1925) was an American politician and  newspaper editor from Toledo, Ohio, as well as an officer in the Union army during the Civil War. He served nine terms in the United States Congress, and was a noted pacifist during World War I.

Early life and career
Sherwood was born in Stanford, New York. After attending the local public schools, he attended the Hudson River Institute in Claverack, New York, and Antioch College in Ohio.  He then studied law at the Ohio Law College in Poland, Ohio.  After finishing school in 1857, Sherwood became the editor of the Williams County Gazette in Bryan, Ohio. Sherwood was married to Kate Brownlee Sherwood (1841-1914), a writer of popular patriotic poetry, and together the couple had two children, James and Lenore.

Sherwood first entered politics in October 1860 when he was elected the probate judge of Williams County.  Because of the Civil War, Sherwood's term as judge was short.

Civil War
Soon after President Abraham Lincoln's call for volunteers in April 1861, Sherwood resigned from his judgeship and enlisted as a private in the 14th Ohio Infantry. Sherwood transferred to the 111th Ohio Infantry, initially serving as adjutant, but mustered out with the regiment as lieutenant colonel. He participated in the Carolinas campaign, the final major campaign in the Eastern Theater of the war.

On February 25, 1865, President Abraham Lincoln nominated Sherwood for appointment to the grade of brevet brigadier general for conspicuous service during the Battle of Franklin, to rank from February 27, 1865, and the United States Senate confirmed the appointment on March 10, 1865.

After the war he became a companion of the Ohio Commandery of the Military Order of the Loyal Legion of the United States.

Postbellum career
After being mustered out of the military on June 27, 1865, Sherwood moved to Toledo, Ohio. There he became the editor of the Toledo Daily Commercial.  He also began writing political editorials for The Cleveland Leader.

Political career
Once again, Sherwood became involved in Ohio politics as a member of the Republican Party.  In 1868 and again in 1870, he was elected as Secretary of State of Ohio.  Sherwood successfully ran for the United States House of Representatives in 1872 and served one term.

Once his term in Congress had ended, Sherwood returned to Cleveland and served as the owner and editor of the Toledo Journal from 1875 to 1884.  He also remained active in politics during this era.  He was elected probate judge of Lucas County in 1878 and again in 1881.  In 1885, Sherwood became the editor of the Canton News-Democrat, a position that he continued to hold for the following decade.

Return to Congress
In the 1870s, Sherwood had briefly supported the platform of the National Greenback Party.  In 1879, he chose to identify himself with the Democratic Party with which he remained for the rest of his life. He was nominated Representative of Ohio's 18th congressional district in 1896, but lost. As a Democrat, he was elected to the United States House of Representatives in 1906. Sherwood served for seven straight terms in Congress until he failed to win reelection in 1920.  When World War I began, he refused to support the United States declaration of war and refused to vote in favor of the draft.  He believed that the United States should not get involved in a European war.  Sherwood's pacifist views made him very unpopular in his home state, where Ohioans believed that he was being unpatriotic. He was defeated for reelection in 1920.

In 1922, Sherwood was once again elected to the House of Representatives, but he was defeated in his reelection bid in 1924.

Death
After completing his term, Sherwood retired from politics and moved back to Toledo.  He died there only a few months later and was buried in the city's Woodlawn Cemetery.

See also

List of American Civil War brevet generals (Union)

Notes

References
 Retrieved on 2008-11-05
biography at Bivouac Books
14th OVI webpage
Rootsweb biography Rootsweb

External links

1835 births
1925 deaths
American newspaper editors
Antioch College alumni
Mayors of Toledo, Ohio
People of Ohio in the American Civil War
People from Stanford, New York
Union Army officers
Secretaries of State of Ohio
Ohio Greenbacks
American anti–World War I activists
Activists from New York (state)
Republican Party members of the United States House of Representatives from Ohio
Democratic Party members of the United States House of Representatives from Ohio